Penal harm, an intentionally harsher punishment than "deprivation of liberty", is a range of unpleasant and miserable conditions and injuries justified by a certain ideology custodial sentences (mainly in prison or reformatory), inmates should endure additional pain and suffering, not just having their basic rights taken away, to make the punishment deliberately harder.

While proponents of judicial harm claim this improves the desirable deterrent effect of detention (this despite the facts first-time offenders are often entirely unaware of prison conditions, many crimes are not premeditated or carried out with deliberative thought that considers being caught and punished), it does form a controversial appendage of a body of theory known as retribution; its perception as cruelty rather than justice may endanger both internal security and prospects for rehabilitation and goes against the humane ideal of most human rights advocates, possibly qualifying legally as inhumane punishment, an infringement on human rights under the UN rules.

Although internal punishments, imposed by prison authorities, are not strictly penal harm as such, since they are not independent from the convict's behavior, arbitrary application and choice of cruel modes, including corporal punishment (in South East Asian countries this can include the dreaded rattan caning), perfectly fit the rationale.

Traditional forms include:
 hard labor
 rationed, unappetizing or even unhealthy food
 various discomforts such as poor hygiene, small and overcrowded cells, hard bunks, insufficient protection against cold
 long isolation, even in a dark 'hole'
 sleep deprivation
 humiliating procedures such as strip searches
 prison rape 
 denial of visits, correspondence and recreation.

In the 1990s and 2000s, penal harm has taken (among other things) the form of poor health care for inmates; this includes the denial of medicine for patients diagnosed with HIV/AIDS.

It must be pointed out that many of the physical harms can also arise accidentally, as a result of understaffing, insufficient budget, or even legal considerations (such as delays deemed necessary for appeal procedures).

See also
Prisoner abuse
Law and order (politics)

References

Penal imprisonment
Prisoner abuse